Paige is a gender neutral given name.  It is of Latin origin from Byzantine "Págius" (young helper / mate of young nobles), derived from the Greek "Paidion" (child). A page in medieval households was usually a young boy whose service was the first step in his training as a knight.  Use may possibly indicate an ancestor who was a page.

In modern times Paige has become a given name, generally given to girls living in North America since the middle of the 20th century, but also occasionally to boys.

People

Given name

 Paige (wrestler), professional wrestler, real name Saraya-Jade Bevis
 Paige Ackerson-Kiely (born 1975), modern American poet
 Paige Braddock, cartoonist of Jane's World
 Paige Bradley (born 1974), American artist and sculptor
 Paige Bueckers (born 2001), American basketball player
 Paige Chua (born 1981), Singaporean model and television actress
 Paige Conners (born 2000), Israeli-American pairs figure skater who competed at the 2018 Winter Olympics, representing Israel
 Paige Davis (born 1969), American actress
 Paige Dunham (born 1962), American ventriloquist and stand-up comedian
 Paige Gordon (born 1973), retired female diver from Canada
 Paige Haley (born 1966), musician and producer
 Paige Hareb (born 1990), professional surfer from New Zealand
 Paige Hemmis (born 1972), American television personality, host of Extreme Makeover: Home Edition
 Paige Hurd (born 1992), American actress
 Paige Kelton, weekday television news anchor at WTEV/WAWS in Jacksonville, Florida
 Paige Kreegel (born 1958), American politician
 Paige Layle (born 1998), Canadian autism advocate
 Paige Lawrence (born 1990), Canadian pair skater
 Paige Lewis, American singer-songwriter
 Paige Mackenzie (born 1983), American professional golfer
 Paige Mayo (born 1986), American professional wrestling personality
 Paige Miles (born 1985), American singer and American Idol contestant
 Paige Moss (born 1973), American actress
 Paige Niemann, American social media personality
 Paige O'Hara (born 1956), the voice of Belle in Disney's Beauty and the Beast
 Paige Omartian (born 1990), American Christian singer-songwriter
 Paige Palmer (died 2009), American fitness expert
 Paige Patterson (born 1942), president of Southwestern Baptist Theological Seminary in Fort Worth, Texas
 Paige Peterson (born 1955), American painter and illustrator
 Paige Railey (born 1987), American sailor, races in the Laser Radial division
 Paige Renkoski (born 1960), American woman who went missing in 1990
 Paige Rense (1929–2021), editor emeritus of Architectural Digest, editor-in-chief from 1975 to 2010
 Paige Rini (born 2000), Canadian water skier
 Paige Segal (born 1987), American actress
 Paige Shand-Haami, film and television actress
 Paige Spara, American actress
 Paige Spiranac (born 1993), American professional golfer and social media personality
 Paige St. John, American journalist for the Sarasota Herald-Tribune
 Paige Summers (born 1976), American adult model
 Paige Turco (born 1965), American actress
 Paige VanZant (born 1994), professional mixed martial arts fighter
 Paige Young, Playboys Playmate of the Month in November 1964
 Paige Zemina (born 1968), former American college and international swimmer, Olympic bronze medalist

Surname

 Alonzo C. Paige (1797–1868), New York politician and judge
 Bruce Paige (born 1948), newsreader in Brisbane, Australia
 Calvin Paige (1848–1930), U.S. Representative from Massachusetts
 Caroline Paige (born 1961), the first officer in the Royal Air Force to have a sex change
 Chantelle Paige (born 1988), American singer-songwriter and actress
 Constantin Le Paige (1852–1929), Belgian mathematician
 David R. Paige (1844–1901), U.S. Representative from Ohio
 Don Paige (born 1956), retired middle-distance runner from the United States
 Elaine Paige OBE (born 1948), English singer and actress
 Gilbert Paige (c. 1595 – 1647), Mayor of Barnstaple
 Glenn D. Paige (1929–2017), American political scientist
 Janis Paige (born 1922), American film, musical theatre and television actress
 Jason Paige (born 1969), American singer, writer and producer, and stage, film, and television actor
 Jean Paige (1895–1990), American film actress of the silent era
 Jennifer Paige (born 1973), American singer-songwriter
 Kathleen Paige (born 1948), American Program Director of Aegis Ballistic Missile Defense
 Kevin Paige (born 1966), recording artist on Chrysalis
 Kobra Paige (born 1988), lead vocalist for Canadian heavy metal band Kobra and the Lotus]
 Kymberly Paige (born 1961), American model and actress
 Mabel Paige (1880–1954), American film actress
 Mabeth Hurd Paige (1869–1961), Minnesota politician
 Marcus Paige (born 1993), American college basketball player
 Mitchell Paige (1918–2003), recipient of the Medal of Honor from World War II
 Pat Paige (1882–1939), Major League Baseball pitcher
 Peter Paige (born 1969), American actor, director, and screenwriter
 Richard G. L. Paige (1846-1904), one of the first African-Americans delegates to be elected in Virginia
 Robert Paige (1911–1987), actor, TV newscaster and political correspondent
 Robin Paige, pen name of Susan Wittig Albert (born 1940), American mystery writer
 Rod Paige (born 1933), 7th United States Secretary of Education from 2001 to 2005
 Satchel Paige (1906–1982), American baseball player
 Seneca Paige (1788–1856), American-born businessman and political figure in Canada East
 Stephone Paige (born 1961), former professional American football player
 Tarah Paige (born 1982), American gymnast, dancer and actress
 Tony Paige (born 1962), former professional American football player
 Tony Paige (boxing) (born 1953), American radio talk show host and boxing color analyst
 Woody Paige (born 1946), American sports columnist
 Yasmin Paige (born 1991), English actress

Fictional characters

 Paige Dineen, in the television series Scorpion
 Paige Fox, in the FoxTrot comic
 Paige Guthrie, member of Marvel Comics team the X-Men
 Paige Logan, antagonist in the Canadian animated series Grossology, voiced by Melissa Altro
 Paige Matheson, lead character in the primetime serial Knots Landing; played by Nicollette Sheridan
 Paige Matthews, lead character on the American television series Charmed; played by Rose McGowan
 Paige Michalchuk, on the Canadian television series Degrassi: The Next Generation
 Paige O'Malley, a supporting character in the video game series Delicious
 Paige Smith, in the Australian television series Neighbours
 Paige Tico, in the Star Wars film The Last Jedi

See also
 Paich

External links
 Paige (Etymology)

English feminine given names
English unisex given names
English-language unisex given names
English-language surnames
Feminine given names
Masculine given names